Ricardo "Richard" Leyva Muñoz Ramirez (February 28, 1960 – June 7, 2013), dubbed the Night Stalker, the Valley Intruder (as his attacks were first clustered in the San Gabriel Valley), and the Walk-In Killer was an American serial killer and sex offender whose crime spree took place in California between June 1984 and August 1985. He was convicted and sentenced to death in 1989. He died in 2013 while awaiting execution.

Ramirez's childhood is considered an influence on his crimes. Frequently abused by his father, Ramirez began developing gruesome and macabre interests in his early and mid-teens from his older cousin, Miguel ("Mike") Ramirez, who also taught him some of the military skills that he would go on to use during his year-long killing spree. Ramirez also cultivated a strong interest in Satanism and the occult. By the time he had left his home in Texas and moved to California at the age of 22, he had begun frequently using cocaine. Ramirez would often commit burglaries to support his drug addiction, many of which were later frequently accompanied by murders, attempted murders, rapes, attempted rapes, and assaults.

Ramirez's highly publicized home invasion and murder spree terrorized the residents of the Greater Los Angeles area and later the San Francisco Bay Area over the course of fourteen months. However, his first known murder occurred as early as April 1984; this crime was not connected to Ramirez, nor was it known to be his doing, until 2009. Ramirez used a wide variety of weapons and different murder methods, including handguns, various types of knives, a machete, a tire iron, and a claw hammer. He punched, pistol whipped, and strangled many of his victims, both with his hands and in one instance a ligature, stomped at least one victim to death in her sleep, and tortured another victim by shocking her with a live electrical cord. Ramirez also frequently enjoyed degrading and humiliating his victims, especially those who survived his attacks or whom he explicitly decided not to kill, by forcing them to profess that they loved Satan, or telling them to "swear on Satan" that there were no more valuables left in their homes he had broken into and burglarized.

In 1989, Ramirez was convicted of thirteen counts of murder, five attempted murders, eleven sexual assaults, and fourteen burglaries. The judge who upheld Ramirez's nineteen death sentences remarked that his deeds exhibited "cruelty, callousness, and viciousness beyond any human understanding". Ramirez never expressed any remorse for his crimes. He died on June 7, 2013, of complications from B-cell lymphoma while awaiting execution on California's death row.

Early life and education
Ricardo "Richard" Leyva Muñoz Ramirez was born in El Paso, Texas, on 28 February 1960, at 2.07 a.m., to Julián and Mercedes Ramirez, the youngest of their five children. His father Julián, a Mexican national and former Ciudad Juárez policeman who later became a laborer on the Atchison, Topeka, and Santa Fe Railway, was an alcoholic who was prone to fits of anger that often resulted in physical abuse towards his wife and children. Richard began smoking marijuana and drinking alcohol at the age of 10.

As a 12-year-old, Richard, or "Richie" as he was known to his family, was strongly influenced by his older cousin, Miguel ("Mike") Ramirez, a decorated Green Beret combat veteran who himself had already become a serial killer and a rapist during his time in the United States Army in the Vietnam War. Mike often boasted of his brutal war crimes, and shared Polaroid photos with Richard showing Vietnamese women whom he had raped, murdered, and dismembered or decapitated. Richard would later state while incarcerated that he was fascinated, rather than repulsed, by the images and stories Mike shared with him. Mike taught his young cousin some of his military skills, such as killing with stealth and effectively staying hidden in the dark, especially at night. Around this time, Richard began to seek escape from his father's violent temper by sleeping in a local cemetery.

Richard was present on May 4, 1973, when Mike fatally shot his wife, Jessie, in the face with a handgun during a domestic argument. Like the graphic photos and stories of his cousin's war crimes in Vietnam, Ramirez would later similarly remark that witnessing the murder was not traumatic for him in any traditional sense, but rather a subject of fascination. After the shooting, Richard became sullen and withdrawn from his family and peers. Mike was later found not guilty of Jessie's murder by reason of insanity, with the shooting attributed to post-traumatic stress disorder from his service in Vietnam; he was confined for several years at the Texas State Mental Hospital.

Shortly after the shooting, Richard moved in with his older sister, Ruth, and her husband, Roberto, an obsessive "peeping tom" who took Richard along on his nocturnal exploits. After Mike was released from the mental hospital in 1977, he sometimes accompanied Richard and Roberto on these voyeuristic walks, spying on women in the nearby areas through their windows. By the time Richard had turned 14 in early 1974, he began using LSD frequently. He and Mike resumed bonding over their shared use of drugs and alcohol. It was during this period that Richard began to cultivate an interest in Satanism and the occult.

When he reached adolescence, Richard Ramirez began to meld his burgeoning sexual fantasies with graphic violence including forced bondage/BDSM, murder, mutilation, and rape. While still in school, he took a job at a local Holiday Inn and used his passkey to rob sleeping patrons. On at least one occasion, Ramirez molested two children in an elevator at the hotel, but he was never reported or prosecuted for this act. His employment ended abruptly after Ramirez attempted to rape a woman in her hotel room and was caught in the act by the victim's husband. Although the husband beat Ramirez at the scene, criminal charges were dropped when the couple, who lived out of state, declined to return to Texas to testify against him.

Ramirez dropped out of Jefferson High School in the ninth grade. In 1982, at the age of 22, he moved to and settled permanently in California. It was around this time that Ramirez began to use cocaine, which quickly became his substance of choice, and began to commit theft and burglaries to procure money for sustaining his addiction. He lived nomadically between San Francisco and Los Angeles County during this time prior to his incarceration. He frequently traveled between the northern and southern areas of California both before and during his yearlong crime spree.

Murders
On April 10, 1984, Ramirez murdered Mei Leung, a 9-year-old Chinese-American girl, in the basement of his apartment building in the Tenderloin district of San Francisco. Leung was with her 8-year-old brother and looking for a lost one-dollar bill when Ramirez approached the girl and told her to follow him into the basement to find it. Once they were in the basement, Ramirez beat, strangled, and raped Leung before stabbing her to death with a switchblade, hanging her partially nude body from a pipe by her blouse. The killing was not linked to Ramirez until 2009 when his DNA was matched to a sample obtained at the crime scene.

In 2016, officials disclosed evidence of a second suspect, identified through another DNA sample retrieved from the scene, who is believed to have been present at Leung's murder. Authorities have not publicly identified the suspect, described as being a juvenile at the time, and have not brought charges due to the lack of evidence.

"Night Stalker" crimes 

On June 28, 1984, 79-year-old Jennie Vincow was found murdered in her apartment in Glassell Park, Los Angeles. She had been stabbed repeatedly in the head, neck, and chest while asleep in her bed, and her throat slashed so deeply that she was nearly decapitated. Ramirez's fingerprint was found on a mesh screen he removed to gain access through an open window. This, Ramirez's second known murder, established his pattern of breaking into homes, committing particularly vicious murders, and frequently burglarizing his victims either before or after killing them, which was mainly to support his cocaine addiction and pay his rent.

On March 17, 1985, Ramirez attacked 22-year-old Maria Hernandez outside her home in Rosemead, California, shooting her in the face with a .22 caliber handgun after she pulled into her garage. She survived when the bullet ricocheted off the keys she held in her hands as she lifted them to protect herself. Hernandez played dead until Ramirez left the scene. Inside the house, her roommate, Dayle Yoshie Okazaki, age 34, heard the gunshot and ducked behind a counter when she saw Ramirez enter the kitchen. When she raised her head to get a look at what had happened, he shot Okazaki once in the forehead, killing her instantly.

Within an hour of the Rosemead home invasion, Ramirez pulled 30-year-old Tsai-Lian "Veronica" Yu out of her car in Monterey Park, shot her twice with a .22 caliber handgun, and fled. She was pronounced dead upon arrival at the hospital. The two murders, and an attempted third, in a single day attracted extensive coverage from news media, who dubbed the attacker, described as curly-haired with bulging eyes and wide-spaced, rotting teeth, "The Walk-In Killer" and "The Valley Intruder".

On March 27, 1985, Ramirez entered a home that he had burglarized a year earlier just outside of Whittier, California, at approximately 2 a.m. and killed the sleeping Vincent Charles Zazzara, age 64, with a gunshot to his head from a .22 caliber handgun. Zazzara's wife, Maxine Levenia Zazzara, age 44, was awakened by the gunshot, and Ramirez beat her and bound her hands while demanding to know where her valuables were. While he ransacked the room, Maxine escaped her bonds and retrieved a shotgun from under the bed, which she was unaware was not loaded. She pulled the trigger just after he turned around and saw her. The infuriated Ramirez shot her three times with the .22, killing her, then fetched a large carving knife from the kitchen. He mutilated her body by cutting an inverted cross into her chest, then removed her eyes with the knife and placed them in a jewelry box. He attempted to have sex with her body, but found himself so shaken by her attempting to shoot him that he was unable to achieve an erection. He took the jewelry box with her eyes when he left and kept it at his apartment as a souvenir until his arrest. Vincent and Maxine's bodies were discovered by their son, Peter. Ramirez left footprints from a pair of Avia sneakers in the flower beds, which the police photographed and cast. This was virtually the only evidence that the police had at the time. Bullets found at the scene were matched to those found at previous attacks, and the police determined that a serial killer was at large.

On May 14, 1985, Ramirez returned to Monterey Park and entered the home of Bill Doi, age 66, and his disabled wife, Lillian, age 56. Surprising Doi in his bedroom, Ramirez shot him in the face with a .22 semi-automatic pistol as Doi went for his own handgun. After beating the mortally wounded man into unconsciousness, Ramirez entered Lillian's bedroom, bound her with thumbcuffs, then raped her after he had ransacked the home for valuables. Bill Doi died of his injuries while in the hospital.

On the night of May 29, 1985, Ramirez drove a stolen car to Monrovia, and stopped at the house of Mabel "Ma" Bell, age 83, and her disabled sister, Florence "Nettie" Lang, age 81. Finding a hammer in the kitchen, he bludgeoned and bound Lang in her bedroom, then bound and bludgeoned Bell before using an electrical cord to shock the woman. After raping Lang, he used Bell's lipstick to draw the Satanic pentagram symbol on her thigh as well as on the walls of both bedrooms. The women were found two days later, alive but comatose and critically injured. Bell later died of her injuries in the hospital.

The next day, Ramirez drove the same car to Burbank, and sneaked into the home of Carol Kyle, age 42. At gunpoint, he bound Kyle and her 11-year-old son with handcuffs, then ransacked the house. He released Kyle to direct him to where the family's valuables were; he then raped her repeatedly. Ramirez also repeatedly ordered her not to look at him, telling her at one point that he would "cut her eyes out". He fled the scene after retrieving the child from the closet and binding the two together again with the handcuffs.

On the night of July 2, 1985, he drove a stolen car to Arcadia, and randomly selected the house of Mary Louise Cannon, age 75, a widowed grandmother. After quietly entering Cannon's home, he found her asleep in her bedroom. He bludgeoned her into unconsciousness with a lamp and then stabbed her to death using a 10-inch butcher knife from her kitchen. Ramirez repeatedly stabbed Cannon's body after she was already dead. She was found dead at the scene.

On July 5, 1985, Ramirez broke into a home in Sierra Madre and bludgeoned 16-year-old Whitney Bennett with a tire iron as she slept in her bedroom. After searching in vain for a knife in the kitchen, Ramirez tried to strangle the girl with a telephone cord. He stated that he was startled to see electrical sparks emanate from the cord, and when his victim began to breathe, he fled the house believing that Jesus Christ had intervened and saved her. Bennett survived the savage beating and attempted strangulation, although 478 stitches were required to close the lacerations to her scalp.

On July 7, 1985, Ramirez burglarized the home of Joyce Lucille Nelson, age 60, in Monterey Park. Finding her asleep on her living room couch, he beat her to death by stomping on her face repeatedly. A shoe print from an Avia sneaker was left imprinted on her face. After cruising two other neighborhoods, he returned to Monterey Park and chose the home of Sophie Dickman, age 63. Ramirez assaulted and handcuffed Dickman at gunpoint, attempted to rape her, and stole her jewelry; when she swore to him that he had taken everything of value, he told her to "swear on Satan".

On July 20, 1985, Ramirez purchased a machete before driving a stolen Toyota to Glendale, California. He chose the home of Lela Kneiding, age 66, and her husband Maxon, age 68. He burst into the sleeping couple's bedroom and hacked them with the machete, then killed them with shots to the head from a .22 caliber handgun. He further mutilated their bodies with the machete before robbing the house of valuables. After quickly fencing the stolen items from the Kneiding residence, Ramirez drove to Sun Valley, CA.

At approximately 4:15 am, he broke into the home of the Khovananth family. He shot the sleeping Chainarong Khovananth in the head with a .25 caliber handgun, killing him instantly, then repeatedly raped and beat Somkid Khovananth. He bound the couple's 8-year-old son before dragging Somkid around the house to reveal the location of any valuable items, which he stole. During his assault, he demanded that she "swear to Satan" that she was not hiding any money from him.

On August 6, 1985, Ramirez drove to Northridge and broke into the home of Chris and Virginia Peterson. He crept into the bedroom, startled Virginia, age 27, and shot her in the face with a .25 caliber semi-automatic handgun. He then shot Chris in the neck and attempted to flee; Chris fought back while avoiding being hit by two more shots during the struggle before Ramirez managed to escape. The couple survived their injuries.

On August 8, 1985, Ramirez drove a stolen car to Diamond Bar, California, and chose the home of Sakina Abowath, age 27, and her husband Elyas Abowath, age 31. Sometime after 2:30 am he entered the house and went into the master bedroom. He instantly killed the sleeping Elyas with a shot to the head from a .25 caliber handgun. He handcuffed and beat Sakina while forcing her to reveal the locations of the family's jewelry, and then brutally raped her. He repeatedly demanded that she "swear on Satan" that she would not scream during his assaults. When the couple's 3-year-old son entered the bedroom, Ramirez tied the child up and then continued to rape Sakina. After Ramirez left the home, Sakina untied her son and sent him to the neighbors for help.

Ramirez, who had been following the media coverage of his crimes, left Los Angeles and headed to San Francisco. On August 18, 1985, he entered the home of Peter and Barbara Pan. He shot the sleeping Peter, age 66, in the temple with a .25 caliber handgun, which killed him instantly. He then beat and sexually assaulted Barbara, age 62, before shooting her in the head and leaving her for dead. At the crime scene, Ramirez used lipstick to scrawl a pentagram and the phrase "Jack the Knife" on the bedroom wall. Ramirez again left a shoe print at the scene that detectives discovered and matched to a specific pair of Avia shoes that was not common at the time. Lead detectives Frank Salerno and Gil Carrillo, who contributed to Netflix's Night Stalker: The Hunt for a Serial Killer, contacted the manufacturer of Avia Shoes and were able to retrieve the soles. Upon the discovery of the make and distribution across the United States, only six of them existed in the men's size 11-1/2. With five of them shipped to locations in Arizona, and one shipped to a shoe store in Los Angeles, it was evident that the one pair of its size and kind in the state of California then belonged to Ramirez. When it was discovered that the ballistics and shoe print evidence from the Los Angeles crime scenes matched the Pan crime scene, San Francisco's then-mayor Dianne Feinstein divulged the information, including the gun caliber, in a televised press conference. This leak infuriated the detectives in the case, as they knew the killer would be following media coverage, which gave him the opportunity to destroy crucial forensic evidence. Ramirez, who had indeed been watching the press, dropped his size 11-1/2 Avia sneakers over the side of the Golden Gate Bridge that night. He remained in the area for a few more days before heading back to the Los Angeles area.

That night, he arrived at the home of James Romero Jr., who had just returned from a family vacation to Rosarito Beach in Mexico. Romero's son, 13-year-old James Romero III, happened to be awake. While his family was asleep, James went outside of his house to retrieve a pillow inside a truck, which was locked. When he was outside he heard a rustling noise. Assuming it was an animal, James went to investigate the noise but did not notice anything unordinary. James then went into his garage to begin working on his mini bike before hearing Ramirez's footsteps outside the house. Thinking there was a prowler, James, after observing Ramirez through his bedroom window, went to wake his parents, and Ramirez fled the scene. James raced outside and noted the color, make, and style of the car, as well as a partial license plate number. Romero contacted the police with this information, believing James had chased away a thief.

After this encounter, Ramirez broke into the house of Bill Carns, age 30, and his fiancée, Inez Erickson, age 29, through a back door. Ramirez entered the sleeping couple's bedroom and awakened Carns when he cocked his .25 caliber handgun. He shot Carns three times in the head before turning his attention to Erickson. Ramirez told her that he was the "Night Stalker" and forced her to swear she loved Satan as he beat her with his fists and bound her with neckties from the closet. After stealing what he could find, Ramirez dragged Erickson to another room before raping her. He then demanded cash and more jewelry, and made her "swear on Satan" there was no more. Before leaving the home, Ramirez told Erickson, "Tell them the Night Stalker was here." Erickson untied herself and went to a neighbor's house for help. Surgeons removed two of the three bullets from Carns's head, and he survived his injuries.

Identification of Ramirez 
Erickson gave a detailed description of the assailant to investigators, and police obtained a cast of Ramirez's footprint from the Romero house. The stolen Toyota was found abandoned on August 28 in Koreatown, Los Angeles, and police obtained a single fingerprint from the rear-view mirror despite Ramirez's careful efforts to wipe the car clean of his prints. The print was positively identified as belonging to Ramirez, who was described as a 25-year-old drifter from Texas, with a long rap sheet that included many arrests for traffic and illegal drug violations. The identification of Ramirez's print was described as a "near miracle" as the system used to identify him was recently installed, as well as the fact that the system contained the fingerprints of criminals born after January 1, 1960, only a month before Ramirez was born. On August 29, 1985, law enforcement officials decided to release a mug shot of Ramirez from a 1984 arrest for auto theft to the media, and the "Night Stalker" finally had a face. At the police press conference it was announced: "We know who you are now, and soon everyone else will. There will be no place you can hide."

Other suspected victims
On the night of June 27, 1985, 32-year-old Patty Elaine Higgins was murdered in her Arcadia home. The crime was not discovered until July 2, when she did not show up for work. Her attacker had sodomized her, strangled her, and slashed her throat.

Ramirez was charged with murder and burglary in relation to Higgins' murder. However, the charges against him in the case were eventually dropped due to a lack of concrete physical evidence linking the Higgins murder to the Night Stalker crimes.

Based on a statement Ramirez made to an investigator, he is also a suspect in the San Francisco double murder of Christina and Mary Caldwell. The Caldwell sisters were found stabbed to death in their Telegraph Hill apartment on February 20, 1985. While incarcerated, Ramirez openly bragged to a prison officer and other inmates about having killed "more than 20 people".

Capture

On August 30, 1985, Ramirez took a bus to Tucson, Arizona to visit his brother, unaware that he had become the lead story in virtually every major newspaper and television news program across California. After failing to meet his brother due to him not being home, Ramirez returned to Los Angeles early on the morning of August 31. He walked past police officers, who were staking out the bus terminal in hopes of catching the killer should he attempt to flee on an outbound bus, and into a convenience store in East Los Angeles.

After noticing a group of elderly Hispanic women fearfully identifying him as "el matador" (literally "the killer" in Spanish), Ramirez saw his face on the front page of the newspaper La Opinion with a headline calling him "Invasor Nocturno" (Night Invader) and fled the store in a panic. After running across the Santa Ana Freeway (I-5), he attempted to carjack an unlocked Ford Mustang but was pulled out by angry resident Faustino Pinon. Ramirez ran across the street and attempted to take car keys from Angelina De La Torre. The woman's husband, Manuel De La Torre, witnessed the attempt and struck Ramirez over the head with a fence post in the pursuit. A group of over ten residents formed and chased Ramirez down Hubbard Street in Boyle Heights. The group of citizens forced and held Ramirez down and relentlessly beat him. At around 8 am, police were called over a disturbance in the area with few details with indications of a fight. Police quickly arrived at the 3700 block of Hubbard and found that Ramirez was severely beaten and unarmed and took him into custody. The crowd grew to several hundred people and was becoming unruly toward Ramirez, and responding officer Andy Ramirez (no relation) stayed behind while officer Jim Kaiser drove Ramirez to the Hollenbeck police station.

Trial and conviction

Jury selection for the trial began on July 22, 1988. At his first court appearance, Ramirez raised a hand with a pentagram drawn on it and yelled, "Hail Satan!" On August 3, 1988, the Los Angeles Times reported that some jail employees overheard Ramirez planning to shoot the prosecutor with a gun, which Ramirez intended to have smuggled into the courtroom. Consequently, a metal detector was installed outside, and intensive searches were conducted on people entering.

On August 14, the trial was interrupted because one of the jurors, Phyllis Singletary, did not arrive at the courtroom. Later that day, she was found shot to death in her apartment. The jury was terrified, wondering if Ramirez had somehow directed this event from inside his prison cell, and whether or not he could reach other jurors. However, it was ultimately determined that Ramirez was not responsible for Singletary's death, as she was shot and killed by her boyfriend, who later committed suicide with the same weapon in a hotel. The alternate juror who replaced Singletary was too frightened to return to her home.

On September 20, 1989, Ramirez was convicted of all 43 charges: thirteen counts of murder, five attempted murders, eleven sexual assaults, and fourteen burglaries. During the penalty phase of the trial on November 7, 1989, he was sentenced to death in California's gas chamber. He stated to reporters after the death sentences, "Big deal. Death always went with the territory. See you in Disneyland." The trial cost $1.8 million ($ in  dollars), which at the time made it the most expensive murder trial in the history of California until surpassed by the O. J. Simpson murder case in 1994.

Romantic relationships

By the time of the trial, Ramirez had fans who were writing him letters and paying him visits. Beginning in 1985, Doreen Lioy wrote him nearly 75 letters during his incarceration. In 1988, Ramirez proposed to Lioy, and on October 3, 1996, they were married in California's San Quentin State Prison. For many years before Ramirez's death, Lioy stated that she would commit suicide when Ramirez was executed. However, Lioy eventually broke ties with Ramirez in 2009 after DNA confirmed he had raped and murdered nine-year-old Mei Leung. By the time of his death in 2013, Ramirez was engaged to a 23-year-old writer.

Appeals

On August 7, 2006, Ramirez's first round of state appeals ended unsuccessfully when the California Supreme Court upheld his convictions and death sentence. On September 7, 2006, the California Supreme Court denied his request for a rehearing. Ramirez had additional appeals pending until the time of his death.

Mental health
Psychiatrist Michael H. Stone describes Ramirez as a 'made' psychopath as opposed to a 'born' psychopath. He says that Ramirez's schizoid personality disorder contributed to his indifference to the suffering of his victims and his untreatability. Stone also stated that Ramirez was knocked unconscious and almost died on multiple occasions before he was six years old and as a result "later developed temporal lobe epilepsy, aggressivity, and hypersexuality."

Death
Ramirez died of complications secondary to B-cell lymphoma at Marin General Hospital in Greenbrae, California, on June 7, 2013. He had also been affected by "chronic substance abuse and chronic hepatitis C viral infection".

In popular culture
 Manhunt: Search for the Night Stalker (1989) is a TV movie by Bruce Seth Green, based on the true story of Richard Ramirez and the two Los Angeles police detectives who tried to track him down.
 Nightstalker is a 2002 film written and directed by Chris Fisher based on Ramirez.
 Nightstalker is a 2009 film written and directed by Ulli Lommel based on Ramirez.
 "Richard Ramirez Died Today of Natural Causes" is a 2013 song by Sun Kil Moon, on the album Benji, dealing with cultural and personal impact of Ramirez’s unsensational death relative to the fear his activity once induced.
 The Night Stalker is a 2016 film directed by Megan Griffiths and starring Lou Diamond Phillips as Ramirez.
 American Horror Story: Ramirez is featured in the fifth and ninth seasons of the FX horror anthology series, initially being portrayed by Anthony Ruivivar and then later by Zach Villa.
 "Richard Ramirez" is a song by SKYND from their EP Chapter 1 (2018).
Just a Guy is a 2020 documentary film about Ramirez and the women he corresponded with.
 Night Stalker: The Hunt For a Serial Killer is a 2021 documentary released by Netflix featuring first-person interviews, archival footage, newly shot reenactments, and original photography related to the case.

See also
Joseph James DeAngelo, a.k.a. the Original Night Stalker, who began his crime spree in California in 1976, and shared a similar moniker to the public
Delroy Easton Grant, a serial rapist who operated in London during the 1990s and 2000s, sometimes referred to by the British media as the "Night Stalker"
 List of serial killers in the United States
 List of deaths and violence at the Cecil Hotel

References

Bibliography

External links

Crime Library: The Night Stalker (Archived from the original on 2008-05-29. Retrieved 2016-08-29.)
Interview with Stela Vasques, Supporter and Friend of Serial Killer Richard Ramirez, "The Night Stalker" (Archived from the original on 2013-05-19. Retrieved 2016-08-29.)
History Channel: Richard Ramirez, the Night Stalker (Archived from the original on 2009-06-09. Retrieved 2016-08-29.)

1960 births
1984 murders in the United States
1985 murders in the United States
2013 deaths
20th-century American criminals
 
American male criminals
American murderers of children
American people convicted of attempted murder
American people convicted of burglary
American people convicted of murder
American people convicted of sexual assault
American people of Mexican descent
American people who died in prison custody
American prisoners sentenced to death
American rapists
American Satanists
American serial killers
Child sexual abuse in the United States
Crime in California
Crimes involving Satanism or the occult
Criminals from California
Criminals from Texas
Criminals from Los Angeles
Criminals of the San Francisco Bay Area
Deaths from cancer in California
Deaths from lymphoma
Fugitives
Human trophy collecting
Male serial killers
Necrophiles
People convicted of murder by California
People from El Paso, Texas
People with antisocial personality disorder
People with epilepsy
People with traumatic brain injuries
Prisoners sentenced to death by California
Prisoners who died in California detention
Serial killers who died in prison custody
Torture in the United States